Boltutino is a rural locality (a village) in Staroselskoye Rural Settlement, Vologodsky District, Vologda Oblast, Russia. The population was 2 as of 2002.

Geography 
Boltutino is located 48 km southwest of Vologda (the district's administrative centre) by road. Gornoye is the nearest rural locality.

References 

Rural localities in Vologodsky District